Côte d'Or can refer to:

 Côte-d'Or, French department
 Côte d'Or (brand) Belgian chocolate brand owned by Mondelēz International
 Côte d'Or (escarpment), geographical feature and wine-producing area in Côte-d'Or
 Côte d'Or FC, an association football club in Praslin, Seychelles
 Le Relais Bernard Loiseau, formerly La Côte d'Or, French restaurant in Saulieu, Côte-d'Or
 French ship Océan (1790), renamed Côte d'Or in 1793